Ali Doukhei  (in Arabic:على الدوخي ) is a Lebanese journalist and digital media consultant

Early life 
Ali was born in Lebanon. He started his career as a journalist. He studied at American University of Science & Technology.

Career 
Ali Doukhei started his journalism career at the early age of 23 in 2011, at Musicnation, an entertainment online magazine. Then he moved to the Number one E-Magazine in Lebanon ElFann where he succeeded in interviewing major Arab stars such as; Maya Diab, Ragheb Alama, Myriam Fares, Samira Said, and many others.

Before joining Endemol Middle East Production as Digital media coordinator for star academy Season 9 and 10, Ali worked as a reporter for several household names in the Arab media industry; and he work also as assistant producer for the largest TV shows in the middle east, The Voice Season 3, The Voice Kids Season 1, Sout Al Hayat, Ajmal Snin Omrena, Ana Zahra Junior, and many others.

Recently, he started working also as digital media producer in  Production.

Accomplishments 
 Journalist (elfann.com, musicnation.me)
 Reporter (elfann.com, musicnation.me)
 Digital media coordinator (Star Academy 9 &10, Ajmal Snin Omrena, Tanne W Ghanneh, Sout El Hayat, Ana Zahra Junior 1&2 )
 Digital media producer (Murex Dor 2016, Mr Lebanon 2016/2017, Desert Force)
 Production Coordinator (the voice 3, the voice kids 1)
 Producer assistant (the voice)
 Assistant content producer جائزة الملك عبدالعزيز للادب الشعبي
 Media Consultant (georges wassouf, Madeleine Matar, Amar)

References 

1988 births
Living people
Lebanese journalists